Keaghan Jacobs (born 9 September 1989) is a South African professional soccer player who plays as a midfielder for Arbroath, having previously had two spells at Livingston, a short spell with Bidvest Wits, and a loan to Falkirk.

Career

Livingston
A product of Livingston's youth system, Jacobs made a scoring debut for the first-team on 24 November 2007 in a 4–0 home win against Alloa Athletic in the Scottish Cup. He made his first league appearance on 1 December 2007 in a 2–2 draw against Greenock Morton. He made 5 more appearances in the 2007–08 season. The following season, he gained more first-team experience, making 17 appearances largely as a substitute. 

Although born in South Africa, Jacobs was eligible to play for Scotland through residency eligibility rules. He was considered for selection b the Scotland U21 team, but never played for them.

Jacobs remained with Livingston following their financial difficulties and subsequent demotion to the Scottish Third Division. In December 2009, he signed a new contract with the club keeping him at Almondvale until the summer of 2012. He played a key role in helping the club win back to back Third and Second division championships on their ascent back to the Scottish First Division. On 19 April 2012, Jacobs signed a new two-year contract with the club.

Bidvest Wits
On 10 July 2015, Jacobs signed for Premier Soccer League club Bidvest Wits. He left the Clever Boys in July 2016, after just one year with the club.

Livingston return
After 17 months away from the club, Jacobs returned to Livingston, then in Scottish League One, signing a deal until the end of the 2016–17 season.

On 3 September 2017, in Livingston's match against The New Saints in the Scottish Challenge Cup, Jacobs made his 220th appearance for the club becoming their record appearance holder passing the previous total set by Liam Fox. In April 2018, he signed a new contract with Livingston which also included a testimonial. In the 2017–18 Scottish Premiership play-offs Jacobs scored in both legs of the final as Livingston defeated Partick Thistle 3–1 on aggregate to gain promotion to the Scottish Premiership.

On 6 October 2018, Jacobs scored an equalising goal for Livingston in a draw against Motherwell and in doing so became the first player to score in all four divisions of Scottish football for Livingston. On 22 March 2019, he signed a new three-year contract at Livingston.

On 13 October 2019, Jacobs was rewarded for his time at Livingston with a testimonial match as the club's current side faced a team of Livingston 'legends', including his three brothers.

Falkirk (loan) 
On 29 January 2022, Jacobs joined Scottish League One side Falkirk on loan until the end of the season.

Arbroath 
On 25 May 2022, following the end of his contract at Livingston Jacobs joined Scottish Championship side Arbroath

Personal
Jacobs was also a decent cricketer, having played for West Lothian County Cricket Club and Fauldhouse Cricket Club; he also represented Scotland at under-13 and under-15 levels before deciding to make a career in football.

He has a set of triplet brothers, Devon, Sheldon and Kyle who all played for Livingston. On 27 April 2010, all four brothers played together in a Scottish Third Division match against Albion Rovers. This is believed to be the only occasion in professional football where four brothers have been on the field, playing for the same team.

Career statistics

Honours
Livingston
Scottish Third Division: 2009–10
Scottish Second Division: 2010–11
Scottish Challenge Cup: 2014–15

Individual
Scottish Football League Young Player of the Month: November 2009

References

External links

1989 births
Living people
South African expatriate sportspeople in Scotland
South African soccer players
Scottish Football League players
Livingston F.C. players
Association football midfielders
Soccer players from Johannesburg
Expatriate footballers in Scotland
White South African people
Scottish Professional Football League players
Bidvest Wits F.C. players
Falkirk F.C. players
Arbroath F.C. players
South African expatriate soccer players